Keron is both a given name and a surname.

Notable people with the given name include:
Keron Cottoy (born 1989), Vincentian cricketer 
Keron Cummings (born 1988), Trinidad and Tobago soccer player
Keron DeShields (born 1992), American basketball player in the Israeli National League
Keron Grant (born 1976), Jamaican-American comic book artist
Keron Henry (born 1982), American football player
Keron Toussaint (born 1989), Grenadian sprinter
Keron Williams (born 1984), Jamaican football player

Notable people with the surname include:
Neil Keron (born 1953), British rower

See also
Keroun, Kanepokhari